Gracilaria parvispora, also known by the common names long ogo, red ogo, or simply ogo, is a large species of marine red alga in the genus Gracilaria, endemic to Hawaii. It is highly sought after as an edible seaweed and is popular in mariculture and the marine aquarium trade. Also known as limu ogo in Hawaiian.

Description

Gracilaria parvispora is composed of pointed, cylindrical branches,  in diameter, extending from a central axis,  in diameter, with a single holdfast. As with other species of Gracilaria, Gracilaria parvispora can be highly variable based on environmental conditions. Though generally red in coloration, it may also be yellow, brown, green, white, and black depending on sunlight, water flow, and depth. The branching of the central axis is also variable, with individuals generally, though not always, displaying three orders of branching and lower water flow and salinity bringing out denser branch growth.

Tetrasporangia are scattered and often pear-shaped. Spermatangia take the form of dimples with modified surrounding cells. Gonimoblast tissue is thin-walled. Tubular nutritive cells and lateral and vertical pit connections of the pericarp are conspicuous; the pericarp contents are star-shaped.

Distribution

Natural distribution
Gracilaria parvispora is endemic to Hawaii, with localized distribution around the islands of Oahu and Molokai. It can be found in Kāneʻohe Bay, Ke’ehi Lagoon, One’ula Beach, and ‘Ewa Beach and at Hau’ula, Coconut Island, and the Oceanic Institute of Hawaii Pacific University. Populations of Gracilaria parvispora in Molokai are the result of experimental outplantings of spore-bearing gravel, introduced between 1983-1985 east of Kaunakakai.

It is hypothesized that Gracilaria parvispora is native to Asia and was later introduced to Hawaii for cultivation, though there is no actual evidence. Gracilaria parvispora may have also been a narrow endemic to the islands until its range was expanded by aquaculture. Occurrences of Gracilaria bursa-pastoris from Korea and Japan may actually represent a misidentification of Gracilaria parvispora.

Presence in Baja California Sur
Gracilaria parvispora is an introduced species in Baja California Sur and has been found in San Ignacio Lagoon, San Buto, San Juan de la Costa, and La Concha Beach. The alga's current distribution in the eastern Pacific Ocean and its impacts on native biodiversity remain relatively unknown.

Ecology
Gracilaria parvispora inhabits reef flats and areas with sand-coated rocky substrate.

Under ideal conditions, the alga is a fast grower and rapidly absorbs micronutrients, capable of increasing its biomass by 150% or more in a single month. In fact, it is one of the fastest growing species of Gracilaria and is one of the larger species of red algae native to the Hawaiian islands. Though once common in the region, the alga has become overharvested, with the invasive Gracilaria salicornia having largely replaced Gracilaria parvispora around the island of Oahu.

Conservation
Alongside Gracilaria coronopifolia and Asparagopsis taxiformis, Gracilaria parvispora is one of the three most highly sought after edible seaweeds in the Hawaiian islands; there may possibly be an export market for dried Gracilaria parvispora. In Hawaii, it has historically been incorporated into recipes representing Hawaiian, Korean, Filipino, Japanese and Caucasian cuisines, such as poke, or eaten raw.

In the 1930s, Gracilaria parvispora began to be commercially harvested in Oahu and would become the most popular seaweed in Honolulu fish markets up until the 1970s. Since then, overharvesting has made this species increasingly rare in the wild; its limited availability led to the importation and mariculture of Atlantic Gracilaria tikvaheae as a replacement, which differs from Gracilaria parvispora in taste, texture, and appearance. In 1988, the collection of fertile Gracilaria parvispora, with cystocarps, was outlawed.

Mariculture

Mariculture of Gracilaria parvispora has been extensively researched. In 1991, researchers at the University of Arizona experimented on growing Gracilaria parvispora in Hawaiian fishponds along Molokai's south shore. It was successfully maricultured at mean yields of  when grown inside floating baskets. Growing Gracilaria parvispora attached to lines submerged in Ualapue Pond also yielded high growth rates albeit with poor recovery as the thalli were often severed. Growing Gracilaria parvispora in Ualapue Pond within bottom culture pens resulted in low growth rates due to low light penetration and smothering by silt. Gracilaria parvispora is also difficult to maintain in tank cultures, failing to develop desirable, fine branches (likely due to excessive water flow) and eventually fragmenting into necrotic pieces after several weeks. Resources necessary for water exchange in tank cultures are also prohibitively expensive and energy intensive, including shoreline modifications, a pumping station, and a seawater discharge point.

Nutrition

In 2003, researchers at the University of Hawaiʻi analyzed the nutritional composition of twenty-two edible Hawaiian seaweed species, including Gracilaria parvispora. Fresh Gracilaria parvispora was found to be composed of 90.4 ± 0.1% water. The riboflavin content of dried, powdered Gracilaria parvispora was found to be . The essential mineral element content of dried, powdered Gracilaria parvispora was found to be 1.48% nitrogen, 0.15% phosphorus, 16.00% potassium, 0.49% magnesium, 0.38% calcium, 3.99% sulfur,  boron,  zinc,  manganese,  iron, and  copper. Like other aquacultured Gracilaria species, Gracilaria parvispora did not have an unusually high nutritional value.

In aquaria

Gracilaria parvispora is a highly functional macroalga in marine aquaria and is the most popular species of Gracilaria in the marine aquarium hobby. It is known to be very hardy, though it should ideally be supplemented with trace elements, such as iron. In addition, Gracilaria parvispora can both be grown attached to substrate or left unattached and gently tumbled to dislodge detritus from its branches. Often, this alga is used in refugia for nutrient export, though it also has applications as a hitching post for seahorses and for display. Due to its rapid growth rate, trimmings of Gracilaria parvispora can be harvested from a refugium and used as a nutritious food source for various herbivorous fish and invertebrates, including tangs, rabbitfish, pygmy angelfish, and blennies. If the alga begins to turn white, the affected thallus should be removed as this is a sign of decomposition.

See also
Edible seaweed
Gracilaria
Limu (algae)
List of marine aquarium plant species
Mariculture
Refugium (fishkeeping)
Seaweed farming

References

External links
iNaturalist

Algae of Hawaii
Edible algae
Edible seaweeds
Endemic fauna of Hawaii
Flora of Northwestern Mexico
Flora of the Pacific
Gracilariales
Hawaiian cuisine
Marine biota of North America
Marine fauna of the Gulf of California
Plants described in 1985
Seaweeds
Species described in 1985
Taxa named by Isabella Abbott